Anthony Racioppi (born 31 December 1998) is a Swiss professional footballer who plays as a goalkeeper for Swiss Super League club Young Boys.

Club career 
Racioppi made his professional debut for French club Dijon on 8 October 2020 in a Ligue 1 game against Metz.

On 10 January 2022, Racioppi signed a 3.5-year contract with Swiss club  Young Boys.

International career 
Considered as one of Switzerland's brightest hopes in his position, he already stood out on the international stage thanks to his performances with the Switzerland U21s.

References

External links

 ASF Profile

1998 births
Living people
Footballers from Geneva
Swiss men's footballers
Switzerland under-21 international footballers
Switzerland youth international footballers
Association football goalkeepers
CS Chênois players
Olympique Lyonnais players
Dijon FCO players
BSC Young Boys players
Ligue 1 players
Championnat National 2 players
Swiss expatriate footballers
Expatriate footballers in France
Swiss expatriate sportspeople in France